The 2010–2011 UCI Cyclo-cross World Cup events and season-long competition took place between 17 October 2010 and 23 January 2011, sponsored by the Union Cycliste Internationale (UCI).

Events

External links
 

World Cup
World Cup
UCI Cyclo-cross World Cup